Mohamed Ainanshe Guled  was a Somali Brigadier General and the vice president of the Somali Democratic Republic

Early life 
Ainanshe was born in the Togdheer region and belonged to the Habr Yunis Rer Ainanshe. As a young man he joined the Italian Carabinieri college and graduated in 1952. After the establishment of the SNA he was made head of the 26th division based in Woqooyi Galbeed. Ainanshe is credited for the coining of most Somali Military terms and nomenclature which replaced the Italian and English systems. During his military career he rose to the rank of Brigadier general.

Coup d'etatS 
While paying a visit to Las Anod in the Northern part of the country. Abdirashid Ali Shermarke, then Somalia's president, was shot dead by one of his ilaalos (bodyguards). Just six days after his assassination Major Generals Mohamed Ainanshe and Siad Barre spearheaded a putsch which resulted in a bloodless coup.   The Supreme Revolutionary Council (SRC) that assumed power after President Sharmarke's assassination was led by General Mohamed Ainanshe, General Siad Barre Lieutenant Colonel Salaad Gabeyre Kediye and Chief of Police Jama Korshel.  A power struggle eventually ensued at the SRC's leadership partly due to Siad's increasing nepotism and clannism. In 1971. Ainanshe and Salaad Gabeyre Kediye were charged with attempting to assassinate President Barre. Both men were shortly afterwards found guilty and along with Colonel Abdulkadir Dheer, were publicly executed the following year.

See also 
Hassan Adan Wadadid
Abdulkadir Dheel
Mohamed Ibrahim Egal
Salaad Gabeyre Kediye

References 

Vice presidents of Somalia
Somalian generals
Somalian politicians